Arent Magnin (born 13 January 1825 – 19 September 1888) was a Dutch politician, who made a career in the administration on the Dutch Gold Coast and who later served as mayor in several Dutch municipalities.

Biography
Arent Magnin was born in Meppel to Jean Samuel Magnin and Grietien Wildeboer. He was appointed assistant on the Gold Coast in 1857, serving as commandant of Fort Patience at Apam from 1858 onwards. He was also appointed replacement judge at the Court of Justice in Elmina. During the European leave of governor Cornelis Nagtglas, Magnin temporarily became second in command of the colony, serving as bookkeeper, secretary and public prosecutor under governor ad interim Cornelis Meeuwsen. Upon Nagtglas' return, he was installed adjutant to the governor. Magnin was granted European leave in September 1863.

When Magnin returned to the Gold Coast in September 1864, he was promoted to the rank of resident, and again shortly became second in command until governor Henri Alexander Elias returned from European leave in late 1864. After governor Elias retired to Europe for good a few months later, Magnin was installed governor ad interim. Magnin served from 4 May 1865 until 19 February 1866, when the newly appointed governor Willem Hendrik Johan van Idsinga arrived on the Gold Coast. Magnin was then honourably discharged, retiring from service on the Gold Coast and returning to Europe.

In the Netherlands, Magnin was appointed mayor of Hoogwoud in 1866, of Beverwijk and Wijk aan Zee en Duin in 1867 and of Veendam in 1880. He was still mayor of the latter place when he died in 1888.

Personal life
Magnin married Margaretha Moerman with whom he had six children.

Decorations
Legion d'Honneur

References

1825 births
1888 deaths
Colonial governors of the Dutch Gold Coast
Mayors in North Holland
People from Beverwijk
Mayors in Groningen (province)
People from Veendam
Politicians from Meppel